Albie Armin (born 12 April 2004) is an English professional footballer who plays as a defender for  club Ipswich Town.

Career
Armin began his career at Ipswich Town. On 3 August 2022, he joined National League South club Braintree Town on loan for the first half of the 2022–23 season. He made his first-team debut for Ipswich Town against a senior men's side on 18 October 2022, coming on as an 87th-minute substitute for Edwin Agbaje in a 1–0 defeat at Cambridge United in the EFL Trophy. The East Anglian Daily Times reported that "within seconds he had produced a perfectly-timed slide tackle to prevent a dangerous Cambridge counter-attack".

Style of play
Armin's agency describes him as a left-sided "marauding centre-half with an excellent range of both short and long passing with the ability to shift and unlock teams".

Career statistics

References

2004 births
Living people
Sportspeople from Colchester
English footballers
Association football defenders
Ipswich Town F.C. players
Braintree Town F.C. players
National League (English football) players
English Football League players